Duncan MacLennan (born 13 March 1985), better known by his stage name DCUP (pronounced "D-cup"), is an Australian record producer, DJ and remixer. He is best known for his collaboration with fellow Australian band Yolanda Be Cool on their international hit single "We No Speak Americano", which samples Renato Carosone and Nicola Salerno's 1956 hit "Tu Vuò Fà L'Americano", on the Australian indie label, Sweat It Out.

"We No Speak Americano" topped the UK, Irish and Danish charts and reached the Top 5 in Australia, Netherlands, Spain, Sweden and Norway. It was also a chart hit in Italy, Belgium and New Zealand. It was not the first time DCUP had collaborated with Yolanda Be Cool; he also remixed their hit "Afro Nuts" in 2009.
 
DCUP produces mainly funk and disco style music.

Discography

Extended plays

Singles

As lead artist

Remixes
2009
 Yolanda Be Cool - "Afro Nuts" (DCUP Remix)
 Killa Kela - "Everyday" (DCUP Remix)
 Act Yo Age featuring Drop The Lime - "Night Of The Hornheadz" (DCUP Remix)
 Pablo Calamari - "Think About You" (DCUP Remix)
 KillaQueenz - "Boyfriend" (DCUP Remix)

2010
 Alesha - "Drummer Boy" (Yolanda Be Cool & DCUP Remix)
 Cicada - "Your Love" (DCUP Remix)
 Jazzbit - "Sing Sing Sing" (Yolanda Be Cool & DCUP Remix)
 Grum - "Can't Shake This Feeling" (DCUP Remix)
 Denzal Park - "Filter Freak" (DCUP Remix)
 Phonat - "When Love Hits The Fan" (DCUP Remix)
 Art vs. Science - "Magic Fountain" (DCUP Remix)

2011
 Toute Freak - "Neighbour" (DCUP Remix)
 Jessica Mauboy - "Saturday Night" (DCUP Remix)
 So Called Friend featuring Marc Deal - "Near Impossible" (DCUP Remix)

2012
 Peking Duk - "The Way You Are" (DCUP Remix)
 Grant Smillie Walden featuring Zoe Badwi - "A Million Lights" (DCUP Remix)
 P-Money and Dan Aux - "Kinda Lovin" (DCUP Remix)

2013
 Estate - "Slipstream" (DCUP Remix)

2014
 "Sugarman" (DCUP Remix)

2015
 "Soul Makossa (Money)" (DCUP Remix)

References

External links
DCUP on Myspace
DCUP at Discogs

ARIA Award winners
Australian DJs
Australian record producers
Remixers
Living people
1985 births
Electronic dance music DJs